Federico Domínguez (born 17 May 1991) is an Argentine professional footballer who plays as a midfielder for Italian Eccellenza club Budoni.

Career
Domínguez's career got underway with Newell's Old Boys in 2010, making his professional debut on 7 August during a home defeat to Estudiantes (LP) in the Argentine Primera División. Between 2012 and 2014, after two appearances for Newell's, Domínguez was loaned out twice. In July 2012 to Atlanta of Primera B Metropolitana, and to Torneo Argentino A's Unión Mar del Plata. In total, he featured a total of seventeen times for those clubs. For Unión, Domínguez netted his first senior goal; versus Estudiantes (SL) on 30 September 2013. A permanent move to Deportivo Morón was completed in August 2014.

He remained with Morón for the 2014 and 2015 campaigns, scoring five goals in fifty appearances. On 26 July 2016, Crucero del Norte signed Domínguez. The last of thirty-six appearances for Crucero came a year later during a fixture with Gimnasia y Esgrima, in a season that ended with relegation from Primera B Nacional. 2017–18 saw Domínguez spend it with Aldosivi, a team that ended top of the table and one that gained promotion to the Primera División. However, he was selected in just three fixtures for Aldosivi. Cypriot First Division side Nea Salamina became Domínguez's seventh career team in 2018.

In 2019, Domínguez moved to Bolivian Primera División side Real Potosí. He scored his opening goal during his sixth match, netting in a 3–2 league victory over Destroyers on 11 February. Another goal followed in May against Bolívar, amid thirty-five appearances in his first season. He then featured seventeen times across the subsequent 2020 campaign as they finished third bottom. In January 2021, Domínguez, after prematurely being announced as new signing by Atlético Palmaflor, moved to fellow top-flight team Guabirá; who had just qualified for the Copa Sudamericana.

On 14 January 2022, Domínguez moved to Italy to join Serie D club Lavello. In July 2022, he left Lavello to join Eccellenza Sardinia amateurs Budoni.

Career statistics
.

Honours
Aldosivi
Primera B Nacional: 2017–18

References

External links

1991 births
Living people
People from Villa María
Argentine footballers
Association football midfielders
Argentine expatriate footballers
Expatriate footballers in Cyprus
Expatriate footballers in Bolivia
Argentine expatriate sportspeople in Cyprus
Argentine expatriate sportspeople in Bolivia
Argentine Primera División players
Primera B Metropolitana players
Torneo Argentino A players
Primera Nacional players
Cypriot First Division players
Bolivian Primera División players
Newell's Old Boys footballers
Club Atlético Atlanta footballers
Unión de Mar del Plata footballers
Deportivo Morón footballers
Crucero del Norte footballers
Aldosivi footballers
Nea Salamis Famagusta FC players
Club Real Potosí players
Guabirá players
Sportspeople from Córdoba Province, Argentina